Sukelus is a genus of Scarabaeidae or scarab beetles in the tribe Onthophagini, containing the single species Sukelus jessopi.

References

Scarabaeinae